Cymopterus humilis, synonym Oreoxis humilis, is a rare species of flowering plant in the carrot family known by the common name Rocky Mountain alpineparsley. It is endemic to Colorado in the United States, where it is known only from the vicinity of Pikes Peak. There are three occurrences, for a total population of about 4240 individuals.

This perennial herb grows about 12 centimeters tall and blooms in yellow flowers during the summer. It grows on granite substrates above the tree line.

The plant is threatened by construction and maintenance on the Pikes Peak Highway.

References

External links
USDA Plants Profile

humilis
Flora of Colorado
Taxa named by Constantine Samuel Rafinesque
Plants described in 1830